Wanganella porcellana, common name the porcellain false top shell, is a species of sea snail, a marine gastropod mollusk, unassigned in the superfamily Seguenzioidea.

Description
The shell grows to a height of 2.3 mm.

Distribution
This marine species occurs off Queensland, Southwest Australia and Tasmania

References

External links
 To World Register of Marine Species
 
 Ponder W. F. (1985) A review of the genera of the Rissoidae (Mollusca: Mesogastropoda: Rissoacea). Records of the Australian Museum supplement 4: 1-221
 Molluscs of Tasmania: Putilla porcellana

porcellana
Gastropods described in 1900